"Who Made Who" is a song and a single by the Australian hard rock band AC/DC, taken from their 1986 album, Who Made Who. The 12-inch single format of the single features an extended mix of the song and can be found in the Deluxe Edition of AC/DC's Backtracks Boxset, on Disc 1, Studio Rarities. It was one of only three new tracks on Who Made Who, because the album is not only a soundtrack to Stephen King's Maximum Overdrive, but a compilation album featuring tracks from previous albums. The other two new tracks were instrumentals. "Who Made Who" peaked at #23 on the Billboard Mainstream Rock Chart on 19 July 1986, and stayed on the chart for 12 weeks.

In addition to the song itself, "Who Made Who" has also been played live, mostly throughout the subsequent world tour and the Blow Up Your Video World Tour. It was also played live with replacement drummer Chris Slade throughout The Razors Edge World Tour, and with drummer Phil Rudd (who returned to the band in 1994 after being fired from the group 11 years prior) for only one gig at the opening night of the Ballbreaker World Tour in Greensboro, North Carolina, after which the song was dropped and has not been played live since.  A live version was released on the 1992 album AC/DC Live.

Music video
In the video to this song, directed by David Mallet, filmed in the lobby of and onstage at the Brixton Academy music venue in London, fans and radio contest winners were dressed like Angus Young, and carried red cardboard guitars similar to Angus's Gibson SG. The video's plot features scientists replicating Angus by means of science fiction technology; the lookalikes are shown en masse, marching in time to the song and raising their heads to chant the title phrase along with the chorus. A photo of Angus standing amid a group of his counterparts can be found inside the 2003 Digipak release of Who Made Who. A couple of AC/DC shows had some look alike Anguses on the stage with them, such as at the Nassau Coliseum in Uniondale, New York, where six were present.

Personnel
Brian Johnson – vocals
Angus Young – lead guitar
Malcolm Young – rhythm guitar
Cliff Williams – bass guitar
Simon Wright – drums

Charts

Weekly Charts

Year-end charts

References

External links
 
 Lyrics

AC/DC songs
1986 singles
Songs written by Brian Johnson
Songs written by Angus Young
Songs written by Malcolm Young
1986 songs
Atlantic Records singles
Music videos directed by David Mallet (director)